David Silverman (born March 15, 1957) is an American animator who has directed numerous episodes of the animated TV series The Simpsons, as well as its film adaptation. Silverman was involved with the series from the very beginning, animating all of the original short Simpsons cartoons that aired on The Tracey Ullman Show. He went on to serve as director of animation for several years. He also did the animation for the 2016 film The Edge of Seventeen, which was produced by Gracie Films.

Early life and career
Silverman was born to a Jewish family on Long Island, New York. His father, Joseph Silverman, was a chemical engineering professor at the University of Maryland, College Park, for over 30 years. He grew up in Silver Spring, Maryland, and attended the University of Maryland for two years, focusing on art. He then attended UCLA and majored in animation.

Early in his career with The Simpsons, he was a subject on the December 26, 1990, episode (#83) of To Tell the Truth.

The Simpsons
Silverman is largely credited with creating most of the "rules" for drawing The Simpsons. He is frequently called upon to animate difficult or especially important scenes, becoming go-to in Season 2 when he animated the first of Homer's many "rants, freak-outs, and heart attacks". He appeared during the end credits of the Simpsons episode "Goo Goo Gai Pan" giving a quick method of drawing Bart, and is a frequent participant on the Simpsons DVD audio commentaries. A cartoon rendering of him can be seen in "The Itchy & Scratchy & Poochie Show", where he is the animator who draws Poochie (along with renderings of other Simpsons staffers). He was credited as Pound Foolish as the director of the episodes "The Simpsons 138th Episode Spectacular"

Silverman is also the director of The Simpsons Movie, which was released July 27, 2007. He originally left The Simpsons to direct additional sequences for The Road to El Dorado for DreamWorks Animation alongside Will Finn. Some of his other film work includes Monsters, Inc. for Walt Disney Pictures and Pixar, for which he was a co-director (alongside Lee Unkrich).  He is currently a consulting producer and occasional director. He also worked on the animated films Ice Age, Robots, and Looney Tunes: Back in Action.

In 2012, Silverman directed the theatrical short The Longest Daycare starring Maggie Simpson, released in front of Ice Age: Continental Drift. The short was nominated for the Academy Award for Best Animated Short Film. He also directed the follow-up theatrical short Playdate with Destiny in 2020, released in front of Onward.

The Simpsons episodes directed by Silverman
 "Simpsons Roasting on an Open Fire"
 "Bart the Genius"
 "Bart the General"
 "Life on the Fast Lane"
 "Some Enchanted Evening" (with Kent Butterworth)
 "Bart Gets an 'F'
 "Treehouse of Horror" ("The Raven" segment only)
 "Bart vs. Thanksgiving"
 "The Way We Was"
 "Old Money"
 "Blood Feud"
 "Black Widower"
 "Homer's Triple Bypass"
 "Krusty Gets Kancelled"
 "Treehouse of Horror IV" (as David "Dry Bones" Silverman)
 "Another Simpsons Clip Show"
 "Homie the Clown"
 "Mother Simpson"
 "The Simpsons 138th Episode Spectacular" (as Pound Foolish)
 "Treehouse of Horror XIII"
 "Treehouse of Horror XV" (as "The Tell-Tale Silverman") 
 "Treehouse of Horror XVI" (as "Godzilla vs. Silverman")
 "Treehouse of Horror XVII" (with Matthew Faughnan) (as David "Tubatron" Silverman)
 "The Man Who Came to Be Dinner"

The Simpsons episodes written by Silverman

 "Lisa Gets the Blues" (with Brian Kelley)

Style

Silverman's direction and animation is known for its energy, sharp timing, adventurous use of design elements and often complex acting, involving expressions and poses which are often quixotic, emotionally specific or highly exaggerated. It frequently recalls the works of Ward Kimball, Tex Avery, Bob Clampett and Chuck Jones.  His most prolific period of work on The Simpsons can be roughly categorized as beginning with the "Tracey Ullman" episodes and ending in or around season eight of the series, for which he animated Homer's psychedelic dream in "El Viaje Misterioso de Nuestro Jomer (The Mysterious Voyage of Homer)". Other representative examples of Silverman's work on The Simpsons include Homer's histrionic, spasmodic heart attack in "Homer's Triple Bypass", Homer's demented hysterics over the iconic painting of poker-playing canines in "Treehouse of Horror IV" and subsequent turn as an even-more-deranged appropriation of Jack Nicholson's character from "The Shining" in "Treehouse of Horror V", and Homer's over-the-top sugar diatribe from "Lisa's Rival".

Filmography

Television

Feature films

Short films

Klutter!
Silverman worked with Savage Steve Holland to create Klutter! for Fox Kids. It was produced by Fox Kids Company, Savage Studios Ltd, and Film Roman. It was part of Eek! Stravaganza in the fourth season of the 1995–96 season where he voiced John Heap. It lasted eight episodes from September 9, 1995, to April 14, 1996.

Campus tours
Silverman has toured many college campuses, speaking about his experiences as an animator and longtime Simpsons director and producer. He describes his early experiences in the animation field, working on shows such as Turbo Teen and Mister T. He goes on to say that at the point he considered leaving animation to devote his time to cartoon illustration, he took a job animating on The Tracey Ullman Show. He has pointed out that he and his fellow animators Wes Archer and Bill Kopp first started animating The Simpsons shorts on March 23, 1987.

Silverman then elaborates on Simpsons production, the evolution of the show and its characters, and various show facts and trivia. He may show animatics, deleted scenes, and favorite scenes and sequences, while giving background information. He closes by hand-drawing character sketches before the audience.

Music
Silverman plays the tuba and has performed at events like Burning Man with the Transformational All Star Fire Conclave Marching Band and on June 23, 2006, he appeared on The Tonight Show with Jay Leno, where he played his flaming sousaphone. Silverman was a member of the UCLA Bruin Marching Band Sousaphone Section in the early 1980s. He is currently a member of Los Trancos Woods Community Marching Band. In January 2009, Silverman joined the LA band Vaud and the Villains.

References

Further reading
 David Silverman 2007 Video interview with InterviewingHollywood.com
 An interview with David Silverman
 The Simpsons Archive interview
 Video interview, Treehouse Of Horror XVII
 David Silverman presentation at the PICNIC07 conference in Amsterdam, September 2007
Animator David Silverman on 8 Early and Previously Unseen Simpsons Sketches

External links
 
 David Silverman - Speaker Profile on APBSpeakers.com

1957 births
Living people
DreamWorks Animation people
Pixar people
The Simpsons
American animated film directors
American television directors
Animators from New York (state)
Jewish American writers
University of California, Los Angeles alumni
University of Maryland, College Park alumni
Jewish American comedy writers